Grand Casinos was a casino operator, co-founded by poker player Lyle Berman and Dave Anderson, Founder of Famous Dave's BBQ Restaurants, that started out managing several casinos in Minnesota in 1990.

The company ceased to exist when it was purchased by Hilton Hotels which then merged it with its other gaming properties to form Park Place Entertainment in 1998.

History

Grand Casinos owned a total of 8 casinos in 1995.

On December 19, 1995, made a major equity investment in The Stratosphere.

In connection with AirTran Airways, Grand Casinos began offering vacation packages on AirTran August 8, 2005.

Enterprises owned
 Biloxi Star Theater
Grand Casino Gulfport
Grand Casino Biloxi
Grand Casino Tunica

Casinos operated
Grand Casino Mille Lacs
Grand Casino Hinckley
 Grand Casino Avoyelles 
 Grand Casino Coushatta

References

Defunct gambling companies
Hospitality companies of the United States
Gambling companies of the United States
Defunct companies based in Minnesota
Gambling companies established in 1990
Gambling companies disestablished in 1998